In the probability theory field of mathematics , Talagrand's concentration inequality is an isoperimetric-type inequality for product probability spaces. It was first proved by the French mathematician Michel Talagrand. The inequality is one of the manifestations of the concentration of measure phenomenon.

Statement
The inequality states that if  is a product space endowed with a product probability measure and 
is a subset in this space, then for any 

 

where  is the complement of  where this is defined by

and where  is Talagrand's convex distance defined as

 

where ,  are -dimensional vectors with entries
That is,

References

Probabilistic inequalities
Measure theory